The third series of On the Buses originally aired between 2 January 1970 and 27 March 1970, beginning with "First Aid". The series was produced and directed by Stuart Allen for the first ten episodes. The last three episodes were directed by Howard Ross and produced by Stuart Allen. The designer for the series was Andrew Gardner. All the episodes in this series were written by Ronald Chesney and Ronald Wolfe.

It was the first series to be broadcast in colour.

Cast
 Reg Varney as Stan Butler
 Bob Grant as Jack Harper
 Anna Karen as Olive Rudge
 Doris Hare as Mabel "Mum" Butler
 Stephen Lewis as Inspector Cyril "Blakey" Blake
 Michael Robbins as Arthur Rudge

Episodes

{|class="wikitable plainrowheaders" style="width:100%; margin:auto;"
|-
! scope="col" style="background:#2D5A44;color:white;" | Episode No.
! scope="col" style="background:#2D5A44;color:white;" | Series No.
! scope="col" style="background:#2D5A44;color:white;" | Title
! scope="col" style="background:#2D5A44;color:white;" | Directed by
! scope="col" style="background:#2D5A44;color:white;" | Written by
! scope="col" style="background:#2D5A44;color:white;" | Original air date

|}

See also
 1970 in British television

References

External links
Series 3 at the Internet Movie Database

On the Buses
1970 British television seasons